Psychomania (originally released in the United States as The Death Wheelers)  is a 1973 British outlaw biker horror film starring Nicky Henson, Beryl Reid, George Sanders (in his final film) and Robert Hardy.

Plot
Tom Latham, an amiable psychopath and the leader of a violent youth gang named "The Living Dead", enjoys riding his motorcycle with his girlfriend Abby and loves his mother. Tom dabbles in black magic and spends much time at an ancient ruin located in the Surrey countryside known as "The Seven Witches" (a Stonehenge-like circle of standing stones). In a similar vein, his mother and her sinister butler Shadwell get their kicks out of holding séances in their home while they worship some sort of Frog God. Tom's father vanished in a mysterious room shortly after Tom's birth, a room which Tom enters on his 18th birthday and where he sees the Frog God.

This incident leads to Tom committing suicide and, with his mother's help, Tom returns from the dead. Being one of the "undead" means that Tom cannot be killed and has superhuman strength, which he demonstrates when he massacres the people drinking at the local pub. One by one, his fellow bikers commit suicide with the goal of returning as one of the "undead", gathering at "The Seven Witches" to plan their campaign of terror against the locals. Only Abby refuses to commit suicide.

Police Chief Inspector Hesseltine is overwhelmed by the crime wave committed by bikers who are known to be dead; believing that someone is stealing the corpses of the dead bikers, he releases a false report that Abby has died. Hesseltine and the other police plan to trap the culprit when he shows up to claim Abby. Tom and the other bikers kill all the policemen while seizing Abby. However, Tom's mother grows disgusted with the crimes committed by her son and decides to break her bargain with the Frog God. Tom and the other bikers tell Abby to commit suicide but she again refuses to, instead shooting Tom, who is immune to the bullets. As Tom prepares to kill Abby, his mother performs a ritual which breaks the pact. Tom's mother is transformed into a frog while Tom and the rest of the undead bikers are turned into stone, becoming new standing stones at "The Seven Witches". Abby is left alone surrounded by the stones that once were her friends.

Cast

Production
The film was produced by Benmar Productions, which predominately made Spaghetti Westerns in Spain but also produced Horror Express later that same year. (Horror Express had the same writers as Psychomania.) It was made in association with the company Scotia, who had director Don Sharp under long term contract.

Nicky Henson said, "I was a mad motorcyclist," adding "I never had a car. So this script comes through the door and I open it up and it says, ‘Eight Chopped Hog Harley Davidsons crest the brow of a hill.’ I rang my agent and said, ‘I'll do it'."

Henson said when he arrived on set he saw "eight clapped-out 350 AJS’ and Matchless BSAs. I said, 'Where's the Harley Davidsons?’ They said, ‘You gotta be kidding!’ It's the only show I’ve ever been on where there were eight mechanics working the whole time to keep the bikes fanning because they got ’em in some second-hand shop somewhere and they were falling to bits."

Henson said he did all his stunts in the film except three. He says the stuntmen who performed these three were injured after each one.

He said the script was written by "two expatriate Communist sympathisers" and that George Sanders' scenes were shot in ten days to save money as he was being paid more than anyone else in the cast. Henson said Sanders "was great fun on the movie. We laughed and laughed and laughed and spoiled an awful lot of takes. I mean, it must have been a nightmare for the director because we were all so young and behaving so badly and realized that we were all working on something that was kind of peripheral, that would just disappear. But of course it hasn't. That's the weird and wonderful thing about it. People come up to me in the street and quote lines from it now."

Sanders committed suicide soon after making the film, putting an end to a period of life marked by heavy drug use, deterioration of the cerebellum and resultant speech problems.

Director Don Sharp called the film "great fun to do, especially after doing several films in a row like The Violent Enemy. It was a great change, geared for a younger audience as it was." Sharp recalled Sanders as "a sad man... so lonely."

Shooting
The film was originally shot under the title The Living Dead. It was filmed at Shepperton Studios in 1971 with some exterior scenes filmed in the (now demolished and rebuilt) Hepworth Way shopping centre and Wellington Close housing block in Walton-on-Thames, Surrey.

Soundtrack
The film's soundtrack, composed by John Cameron, was released on LP and CD in 2003 by Trunk Records.

Cameron later said, "“I knew we needed a score that was spooky and different but had kind of a rock feeling to it and it was kind of pre-synthesizer... We had to use Shepperton's recording studios and it hadn't been updated since before the war. The hilarious thing is actually having these hooligan musicians all trying to do strange things, scratch inside pianos and turn sounds inside out, but the recording engineer still had a suit and tie on. It was so anachronistic."

Two of Cameron's pieces from the score—"Witch Hunt (Title Theme from the Film Psychomania)" and "Living Dead (Theme from the Film Psychomania)"— were released in 1973 as a 7" single on the Jam label, using the artist name "Frog". This Frog record was reissued in 2011 by Spoke Records as a limited edition vinyl 7".

Reception
The initial reception was mixed (one reviewer for the London Times even wrote that the film was only fit to be shown at an "SS reunion party"), but over time, the film has come to be more highly regarded. It holds a rating of 86% at Rotten Tomatoes based on 7 reviews.

Henson said "At that time, I thought if you do dodgy films, nobody pays to see dodgy films. Of course, you're not realizing that years later they come out on DVD and become 'cults'." However, film historian/director Bruce G. Hallenback stated that the film has a cult following in a book published before it was released on DVD.

Shock Till You Drop called the film "a great one-shot horror movie filled with weird, sometimes eerie atmosphere, crazy stunt work, cheeky performances, mild kink and a unique charm all its own". Variety called it "a low-budget, well-done shocker with a tightly-knit plot and a believable surprise ending". Nerdist called it "very effective thanks to the mixture of heavy action, moody guitar music, and dreamy visuals."

Home media
Severin Films released a restored print on DVD in 2010.

BFI Flipside released a dual-format Blu-ray/DVD edition in the EU on 26 September 2016.

Arrow Films released a dual-format Blu-ray/DVD edition in the USA on 22 February 2017.

References

Notes

External links
 
 
 
Psychomania at Letterbox DVD
Essay on film at Diabolique
Essay on film at Dangerous Minds
Essay on film at Film Inquiry
Essay on film at Senses of Cinema

1973 films
1973 horror films
British supernatural horror films
Films about suicide
Outlaw biker films
Films directed by Don Sharp
Films scored by John Cameron
Films with screenplays by Arnaud d'Usseau
1970s English-language films
1970s British films